The Breda Ba.75 was an Italian prototype two-seat reconnaissance and ground-attack aircraft designed and built by the Società Italiana Ernesto Breda. Only one aircraft was built and the type did not enter production.

Development
Based on the design of the earlier Ba.65 the Ba.75 was slightly larger and was a mid-wing cantilever monoplane and unlike the Ba.65 had a fixed tailwheel landing gear. The Ba.75 was powered by a 900 hp (670 kW) Isotta-Fraschini K.14 radial piston engine. The bottom and lower sides of the fuselage were glazed to allow observation of the ground. The only Ba.75 was built and test flown in 1939.

Specifications

References

Notes

Bibliography

Ba.075
1930s Italian attack aircraft
Mid-wing aircraft
Single-engined tractor aircraft
Aircraft first flown in 1939